The 1996 Atlanta Braves season was the 126th season in the history of the franchise and 31st season in the city of Atlanta. They secured a regular season record of 96-66 and reached the World Series, where they lost to the underdog New York Yankees in six games, failing to defend its championship in 1995. Heavily favored and seen as one of the greatest Braves teams in history and despite taking a 2-0 lead, the Braves unexpectedly lost the next 4 games. This World Series appearance was their fourth appearance in the last 5 years as a franchise, excluding the strike shortened season. Atlanta won its seventh division title (second in the National League East, the other five in the NL West) and its fifth in six years. In the previous round, Atlanta completed a miraculous comeback. After trailing in the NLCS to St. Louis three games to one, Atlanta outscored St. Louis 32-1 in games five through seven to complete the comeback. The collapse was remembered as one of the largest in North American sports history.

The 1996 season was the Braves' final season at Atlanta–Fulton County Stadium, with Game 5 of the 1996 World Series being the last game played in the stadium. Atlanta–Fulton County Stadium was also served as a venue during the 1996 Summer Olympics held in Atlanta, prompting the Braves to go on an extended road trip as their stadium hosted the baseball competition. Following the closing ceremonies of the 1996 Summer Paralympics, Centennial Olympic Stadium was reconstructed as planned into Turner Field, which would become the home of the Braves for the next 20 seasons.

Offseason
 January 3, 1996: Jerome Walton was signed as a free agent by the Braves.
 January 9, 1996: Mike Kelly was traded by the Braves to the Cincinnati Reds for a player to be named later and Chad Fox. The Reds sent Ray King (June 11, 1996) to the Braves to complete the trade.
 March 31, 1996: Mike Bielecki was signed as a free agent with the Braves.

Regular season

Season standings

Record vs. opponents

Game log

|- bgcolor="ccffcc"
| 1 || April 1 || Giants || 10–8 || Maddux (1–0) || Leiter || Borbon (1) || 48,961 || 1–0
|- bgcolor="ccffcc"
| 2 || April 3 || Giants || 15–2 || Glavine (1–0) || VanLandingham || — || 28,728 || 2–0
|- bgcolor="ffbbbb"
| 3 || April 4 || Giants || 1–7 || Watson || Smoltz (0–1) || — || 30,271 || 2–1
|- bgcolor="ffbbbb"
| 4 || April 5 || Cardinals || 4–5 (14) || Bailey || Bielecki (0–1) || Eckersley || 31,071 || 2–2
|- bgcolor="ffbbbb"
| 5 || April 6 || Cardinals || 2–3 (12) || Parrett || Clontz (0–1) || — || 34,649 || 2–3
|- bgcolor="ccffcc"
| 6 || April 7 || Cardinals || 13–3 || Schmidt (1–0) || Busby || — || 28,498 || 3–3
|- bgcolor="ffbbbb"
| 7 || April 8 || @ Dodgers || 0–1 || Nomo || Glavine (1–1) || — || 53,180 || 3–4
|- bgcolor="ccffcc"
| 8 || April 9 || @ Dodgers || 3–1 || Smoltz (1–1) || Astacio || Wohlers (1) || 35,570 || 4–4
|- bgcolor="ffbbbb"
| 9 || April 10 || @ Dodgers || 2–9 || Candiotti || Avery (0–1) || — || 48,194 || 4–5
|- bgcolor="ffbbbb"
| 10 || April 11 || @ Padres || 1–2 || Ashby || Maddux (1–1) || Hoffman || 19,047 || 4–6
|- bgcolor="ccffcc"
| 11 || April 12 || @ Padres || 5–3 || Schmidt (2–0) || Bergman || Wohlers (2) || 25,747 || 5–6
|- bgcolor="ffbbbb"
| 12 || April 13 || @ Padres || 2–6 || Hamilton || Glavine (1–2) || Bochtler || 45,250 || 5–7
|- bgcolor="ccffcc"
| 13 || April 14 || @ Padres || 4–0 || Smoltz (2–1) || Valenzuela || — || 45,014 || 6–7
|- bgcolor="ccffcc"
| 14 || April 16 || Marlins || 5–2 || Avery (1–1) || Brown || Wohlers (3) || 26,625 || 7–7
|- bgcolor="ccffcc"
| 15 || April 17 || Marlins || 4–2 || Maddux (2–1) || Burkett || Wohlers (4) || 28,884 || 8–7
|- bgcolor="ffbbbb"
| 16 || April 18 || Marlins || 3–5 || Hammond || Glavine (1–3) || Nen || 25,300 || 8–8
|- bgcolor="ccffcc"
| 17 || April 19 || Padres || 7–1 || Smoltz (3–1) || Hamilton || — || 27,375 || 9–8
|- bgcolor="ccffcc"
| 18 || April 20 || Padres || 6–5 || McMichael (1–0) || Bochtler || Wohlers (5) || 31,893 || 10–8
|- bgcolor="ffbbbb"
| 19 || April 21 || Padres || 1–2 (15) || Worrell || Thobe (0–1) || Bochtler || 28,829 || 10–9
|- bgcolor="ccffcc"
| 20 || April 22 || Dodgers || 4–1 || Maddux (3–1) || Candiotti || — || 33,080 || 11–9
|- bgcolor="ffbbbb"
| 21 || April 23 || Dodgers || 2–3 || Osuna || Clontz (0–2) || Worrell || 30,475 || 11–10
|- bgcolor="ccffcc"
| 22 || April 24 || @ Giants || 8–3 || Smoltz (4–1) || Watson || — || 13,296 || 12–10
|- bgcolor="ffbbbb"
| 23 || April 25 || @ Giants || 0–8 || Gardner || Schmidt (2–1) || — || 12,436 || 12–11
|- bgcolor="ccffcc"
| 24 || April 26 || @ Cardinals || 6–1 || Avery (2–1) || Benes || — || 34,598 || 13–11
|- bgcolor="ccffcc"
| 25 || April 27 || @ Cardinals || 7–2 || Maddux (4–1) || Osborne || — || 20,757 || 14–11
|- bgcolor="ccffcc"
| 26 || April 29 || @ Cardinals || 4–1 || Glavine (2–3) || Stottlemyre || Wohlers (6) || 25,452 || 15–11
|- bgcolor="ccffcc"
| 27 || April 30 || @ Astros || 7–5 || Smoltz (5–1) || Jones || McMichael (1) || 17,795 || 16–11
|-

|- bgcolor="ffbbbb"
| 28 || May 1 || @ Astros || 0–3 || Hampton || Avery (2–2) || — || 18,546 || 16–12
|- bgcolor="ffbbbb"
| 29 || May 3 || Phillies || 3–6 || Mulholland || Maddux (4–2) || Bottalico || 39,697 || 16–13
|- bgcolor="ccffcc"
| 30 || May 4 || Phillies || 6–3 || McMichael (2–0) || Ryan || Clontz (1) || 44,429 || 17–13
|- bgcolor="ccffcc"
| 31 || May 5 || Phillies || 11–8 || Smoltz (6–1) || Williams || — || 35,471 || 18–13
|- bgcolor="ccffcc"
| 32 || May 6 || Rockies || 4–1 || Avery (3–2) || Thompson || — || 28,725 || 19–13
|- bgcolor="ccffcc"
| 33 || May 7 || Rockies || 6–5 (10) || Clontz (1–2) || Leskanic || — || 29,976 || 20–13
|- bgcolor="ccffcc"
| 34 || May 8 || Rockies || 5–1 || Glavine (3–3) || Reynoso || — || 29,363 || 21–13
|- bgcolor="ccffcc"
| 35 || May 10 || @ Phillies || 11–0 || Smoltz (7–1) || Mulholland || — || 27,068 || 22–13
|- bgcolor="ccffcc"
| 36 || May 11 || @ Phillies || 11–3 || Avery (4–2) || Mimbs || — || 22,823 || 23–13
|- bgcolor="ffbbbb"
| 37 || May 12 || @ Phillies || 0–6 || Grace || Maddux (4–3) || — || 32,314 || 23–14
|- bgcolor="ccffcc"
| 38 || May 13 || Pirates || 9–3 || Glavine (4–3) || Darwin || — || 28,583 || 24–14
|- bgcolor="ccffcc"
| 39 || May 14 || Pirates || 7–3 || Smoltz (8–1) || Wagner || — || 28,175 || 25–14
|- bgcolor="ffbbbb"
| 40 || May 15 || Pirates || 0–3 || Neagle || Avery (4–3) || — || 30,917 || 25–15
|- bgcolor="ccffcc"
| 41 || May 17 || Reds || 8–2 || Maddux (5–3) || Smiley || — || 40,612 || 26–15
|- bgcolor="ccffcc"
| 42 || May 18 || Reds || 2–1 || Clontz (2–2) || Ruffin || Wohlers (7) || 49,553 || 27–15
|- bgcolor="ccffcc"
| 43 || May 19 || Reds || 9–5 || Smoltz (9–1) || Schourek || Wohlers (8) || 41,153 || 28–15
|- bgcolor="ccffcc"
| 44 || May 20 || Cubs || 18–1 || Avery (5–3) || Castillo || — || 29,984 || 29–15
|- bgcolor="ffbbbb"
| 45 || May 21 || Cubs || 2–4 || Telemaco || Wohlers (0–1) || Patterson || 31,045 || 29–16
|- bgcolor="ccffcc"
| 46 || May 22 || Cubs || 9–4 || Glavine (5–3) || Bullinger || — || 33,186 || 30–16
|- bgcolor="ccffcc"
| 47 || May 24 || @ Pirates || 5–3 || Smoltz (10–1) || Darwin || Wohlers (9) || 20,238 || 31–16
|- bgcolor="ffbbbb"
| 48 || May 25 || @ Pirates || 2–6 || Neagle || Avery (5–4) || — || 29,273 || 31–17
|- bgcolor="ccffcc"
| 49 || May 26 || @ Pirates || 6–3 (13) || Wade (1–0) || Miceli || Bielecki (1) || 33,085 || 32–17
|- bgcolor="ccffcc"
| 50 || May 27 || @ Cubs || 9–1 || Glavine (6–3) || Telemaco || — || 33,070 || 33–17
|- bgcolor="ccffcc"
| 51 || May 29 || @ Cubs || 2–0 || Smoltz (11–1) || Trachsel || — || 30,601 || 34–17
|- bgcolor="ccffcc"
| 52 || May 31 || @ Reds || 9–1 || Avery (6–4) || Schourek || — || 33,455 || 35–17
|-

|- bgcolor="ffbbbb"
| 53 || June 1 || @ Reds || 2–3 || Portugal || Maddux (5–4) || Brantley || 34,023 || 35–18
|- bgcolor="ccffcc"
| 54 || June 2 || @ Reds || 6–2 || Glavine (7–3) || Smiley || — || 23,482 || 36–18
|- bgcolor="ccffcc"
| 55 || June 3 || Mets || 5–4 || Clontz (3–2) || Macdonald || Wohlers (10) || 30,162 || 37–18
|- bgcolor="ffbbbb"
| 56 || June 4 || Mets || 6–12 || Wilson || Schmidt (2–2) || — || 32,199 || 37–19
|- bgcolor="ccffcc"
| 57 || June 5 || Mets || 8–6 || McMichael (3–0) || Mlicki || Wohlers (11) || 31,998 || 38–19
|- bgcolor="ffbbbb"
| 58 || June 7 || @ Rockies || 8–19 || Painter || Bielecki (0–2) || — || 48,027 || 38–20
|- bgcolor="ffbbbb"
| 59 || June 8 || @ Rockies || 12–13 || Holmes || McMichael (3–1) || Ruffin || 48,015 || 38–21
|- bgcolor="ccffcc"
| 60 || June 9 || @ Rockies || 8–3 || Smoltz (12–1) || Thompson || — || 48,036 || 39–21
|- bgcolor="ffbbbb"
| 61 || June 10 || @ Mets || 3–8 || Jones || Avery (6–5) || — || 17,439 || 39–22
|- bgcolor="ccffcc"
| 62 || June 11 || @ Mets || 4–3 (13) || Borbon (1–0) || Byrd || Wade (1) || 19,256 || 40–22
|- bgcolor="ffbbbb"
| 63 || June 12 || @ Mets || 2–3 || Clark || Maddux (5–5) || Franco || 18,896 || 40–23
|- bgcolor="ffbbbb"
| 64 || June 13 || Dodgers || 3–6 || Valdez || Glavine (7–4) || Worrell || 39,463 || 40–24
|- bgcolor="ccffcc"
| 65 || June 14 || Dodgers || 3–1 || Smoltz (13–1) || Astacio || Wohlers (12) || 45,389 || 41–24
|- bgcolor="ffbbbb"
| 66 || June 15 || Dodgers || 2–6 || Nomo || Avery (6–6) || Worrell || 49,726 || 41–25
|- bgcolor="ffbbbb"
| 67 || June 16 || Dodgers || 2–3 || Candiotti || Schmidt (2–3) || Worrell || 44,784 || 41–26
|- bgcolor="ccffcc"
| 68 || June 17 || Padres || 9–3 || Maddux (6–5) || Bergman || — || 32,934 || 42–26
|- bgcolor="ccffcc"
| 69 || June 18 || Padres || 5–3 || Clontz (4–2) || Hamilton || Wohlers (13) || 32,730 || 43–26
|- bgcolor="ccffcc"
| 70 || June 19 || Padres || 5–1 || Smoltz (14–1) || Tewksbury || — || 34,823 || 44–26
|- bgcolor="ccffcc"
| 71 || June 21 || Giants || 8–7 (11) || Wade (2–0) || Beck || — || 38,432 || 45–26
|- bgcolor="ccffcc"
| 72 || June 22 || Giants || 6–0 || Maddux (7–5) || Gardner || — || 49,365 || 46–26
|- bgcolor="ccffcc"
| 73 || June 23 || Giants || 1–0 || Glavine (8–4) || Fernandez || Wohlers (14) || 35,645 || 47–26
|- bgcolor="ffbbbb"
| 74 || June 24 || Cardinals || 2–9 || Benes || Smoltz (14–2) || — || 31,971 || 47–27
|- bgcolor="ccffcc"
| 75 || June 25 || Cardinals || 4–3 || Schmidt (3–3) || Stottlemyre || Wohlers (15) || 30,942 || 48–27
|- bgcolor="ffbbbb"
| 76 || June 26 || Cardinals || 7–11 || Benes || Avery (6–7) || — || 31,191 || 48–28
|- bgcolor="ccffcc"
| 77 || June 27 || Cardinals || 3–0 || Maddux (8–5) || Morgan || Wohlers (16) || 32,243 || 49–28
|- bgcolor="ffbbbb"
| 78 || June 28 || @ Marlins || 0–2 || Leiter || Glavine (8–5) || Nen || 30,661 || 49–29
|- bgcolor="ffbbbb"
| 79 || June 29 || @ Marlins || 3–5 || Rapp || Smoltz (14–3) || — || 40,952 || 49–30
|- bgcolor="ccffcc"
| 80 || June 30 || @ Marlins || 5–4 || Clontz (5–2) || Burkett || Wohlers (17) || 34,023 || 50–30
|-

|- bgcolor="ccffcc"
| 81 || July 1 || @ Expos || 7–2 || Avery (7–7) || Rueter || — || 34,116 || 51–30
|- bgcolor="ffbbbb"
| 82 || July 2 || @ Expos || 1–5 || Cormier || Maddux (8–6) || — || 20,075 || 51–31
|- bgcolor="ccffcc"
| 83 || July 3 || @ Expos || 3–1 || Glavine (9–5) || Scott || Wohlers (18) || 26,837 || 52–31
|- bgcolor="ffbbbb"
| 84 || July 4 || Astros || 2–5 || Reynolds || Smoltz (14–4) || Hernandez || 49,060 || 52–32
|- bgcolor="ffbbbb"
| 85 || July 5 || Astros || 1–7 || Kile || Schmidt (3–4) || — || 36,896 || 52–33
|- bgcolor="ccffcc"
| 86 || July 6 || Astros || 4–2 || Bielecki (1–2) || Hampton || — || 41,619 || 53–33
|- bgcolor="ccffcc"
| 87 || July 7 || Astros || 9–1 || Maddux (9–6) || Wall || — || 28,716 || 54–33
|- bgcolor="ffbbbb"
| 88 || July 11 || Marlins || 8–9 || Burkett || Avery (7–8) || Nen || 33,208 || 54–34
|- bgcolor="ccffcc"
| 89 || July 12 || Marlins || 6–3 || Glavine (10–5) || Leiter || Wohlers (19) || 32,517 || 55–34
|- bgcolor="ccffcc"
| 90 || July 13 || Marlins || 3–0 || Smoltz (15–4) || Brown || — || 36,953 || 56–34
|- bgcolor="ccffcc"
| 91 || July 14 || Marlins || 15–10 || McMichael (4–1) || Perez || — || 31,134 || 57–34
|- bgcolor="ccffcc"
| 92 || July 15 || Expos || 5–4 || Maddux (10–6) || Manuel || Wohlers (20) || 32,708 || 58–34
|- bgcolor="ccffcc"
| 93 || July 16 || Expos || 3–2 || Wohlers (1–1) || Scott || — || 31,334 || 59–34
|- bgcolor="ccffcc"
| 94 || July 18 || @ Astros || 3–2 || Smoltz (16–4) || Jones || Wohlers (21) || 35,822 || 60–34
|- bgcolor="ffbbbb"
| 95 || July 19 || @ Astros || 6–7 || Kile || Woodall (0–1) || Wagner || 39,090 || 60–35
|- bgcolor="ffbbbb"
| 96 || July 20 || @ Astros || 1–2 || Wagner || Maddux (10–7) || — || 49,674 || 60–36
|- bgcolor="ffbbbb"
| 97 || July 21 || @ Astros || 3–4 (10) || Hernandez || McMichael (4–2) || — || 45,561 || 60–37
|- bgcolor="ccffcc"
| 98 || July 22 || @ Cardinals || 8–6 || McMichael (5–2) || Mathews || Wohlers (22) || 36,215 || 61–37
|- bgcolor="ccffcc"
| 99 || July 23 || @ Cardinals || 3–2 || Smoltz (17–4) || Stottlemyre || Wohlers (23) || 35,520 || 62–37
|- bgcolor="ccffcc"
| 100 || July 24 || @ Cardinals || 4–1 || Wade (3–0) || Benes || McMichael (2) || 35,411 || 63–37
|- bgcolor="ffbbbb"
| 101 || July 25 || @ Giants || 3–4 || Watson || Maddux (10–8) || Beck || 16,871 || 63–38
|- bgcolor="ccffcc"
| 102 || July 26 || @ Giants || 2–1 || Glavine (11–5) || Leiter || Wohlers (24) || 17,560 || 64–38
|- bgcolor="ffbbbb"
| 103 || July 27 || @ Giants || 5–7 || Gardner || Woodall (0–2) || Beck || 38,761 || 64–39
|- bgcolor="ffbbbb"
| 104 || July 28 || @ Giants || 3–10 || Estes || Smoltz (17–5) || Beck || 34,525 || 64–40
|- bgcolor="ffbbbb"
| 105 || July 30 || @ Padres || 1–2 || Valenzuela || Maddux (10–9) || Hoffman || 24,110 || 64–41
|- bgcolor="ccffcc"
| 106 || July 31 || @ Padres || 7–4 || Glavine (12–5) || Tewksbury || Wohlers (25) || 24,254 || 65–41
|-

|- bgcolor="ccffcc"
| 107 || August 1 || @ Padres || 3–2 || Bielecki (2–2) || Worrell || Wohlers (26) || 24,089 || 66–41
|- bgcolor="ffbbbb"
| 108 || August 2 || @ Dodgers || 1–2 || Radinsky || Smoltz (17–6) || Guthrie || 49,012 || 66–42
|- bgcolor="ccffcc"
| 109 || August 3 || @ Dodgers || 5–3 (18) || Woodall (1–2) || Martinez || — || 42,575 || 67–42
|- bgcolor="ccffcc"
| 110 || August 4 || @ Dodgers || 6–4 || Borbon (2–0) || Guthrie || Wohlers (27) || 45,903 || 68–42
|- bgcolor="ccffcc"
| 111 || August 6 || Phillies || 10–4 || Bielecki (3–2) || Springer || — || 32,036 || 69–42
|- bgcolor="ccffcc"
| 112 || August 7 || Phillies || 14–1 (8) || Smoltz (18–6) || Munoz || — || 29,920 || 70–42
|- bgcolor="ffbbbb"
| 113 || August 8 || Phillies || 1–4 || Beech || Maddux (10–10) || Bottalico || 32,401 || 70–43
|- bgcolor="ffbbbb"
| 114 || August 9 || Rockies || 4–6 || Wright || Glavine (12–6) || Ruffin || 41,275 || 70–44
|- bgcolor="ffbbbb"
| 115 || August 10 || Rockies || 7–9 (10) || Reed || Wohlers (1–2) || Ruffin || 46,064 || 70–45
|- bgcolor="ccffcc"
| 116 || August 11 || Rockies || 4–1 || Smoltz (19–6) || Freeman || Wohlers (28) || 32,961 || 71–45
|- bgcolor="ccffcc"
| 117 || August 13 || @ Phillies || 2–0 || Maddux (11–10) || Hunter || — || — || 72–45
|- bgcolor="ccffcc"
| 118 || August 13 || @ Phillies || 5–2 || Hartgraves (1–0) || Beech || Wohlers (29) || 25,196 || 73–45
|- bgcolor="ffbbbb"
| 119 || August 14 || @ Phillies || 1–4 || West || Glavine (12–7) || Bottalico || 28,206 || 73–46
|- bgcolor="ccffcc"
| 120 || August 15 || @ Phillies || 8–5 || Wade (4–0) || Schilling || — || 28,011 || 74–46
|- bgcolor="ccffcc"
| 121 || August 16 || Pirates || 5–4 || Smoltz (20–6) || Neagle || Wohlers (30) || 39,210 || 75–46
|- bgcolor="ccffcc"
| 122 || August 17 || Pirates || 7–1 || Bielecki (4–2) || Ruebel || — || 49,024 || 76–46
|- bgcolor="ccffcc"
| 123 || August 18 || Pirates || 2–1 (14) || Borowski (1–0) || Cordova || — || 31,587 || 77–46
|- bgcolor="ccffcc"
| 124 || August 20 || Reds || 4–1 || Glavine (13–7) || Burba || Wohlers (31) || 32,658 || 78–46
|- bgcolor="ccffcc"
| 125 || August 21 || Reds || 4–3 || Borbon (3–0) || Brantley || — || 29,213 || 79–46
|- bgcolor="ffbbbb"
| 126 || August 22 || Reds || 2–3 (13) || Carrasco || Borowski (1–1) || Brantley || 31,729 || 79–47
|- bgcolor="ccffcc"
| 127 || August 23 || Cubs || 4–3 || Maddux (12–10) || Trachsel || Wohlers (32) || 38,210 || 80–47
|- bgcolor="ccffcc"
| 128 || August 24 || Cubs || 6–5 || Clontz (6–2) || Casian || — || 46,804 || 81–47
|- bgcolor="ffbbbb"
| 129 || August 25 || Cubs || 2–3 || Foster || Wohlers (1–3) || Wendell || 35,176 || 81–48
|- bgcolor="ffbbbb"
| 130 || August 27 || @ Pirates || 2–3 || Neagle || Smoltz (20–7) || Plesac || 14,603 || 81–49
|- bgcolor="ccffcc"
| 131 || August 28 || @ Pirates || 9–4 || Wade (5–0) || Loaiza || — || 14,591 || 82–49
|- bgcolor="ccffcc"
| 132 || August 29 || @ Pirates || 5–1 || Maddux (13–10) || Lieber || Wohlers (33) || 12,101 || 83–49
|- bgcolor="ffbbbb"
| 133 || August 30 || @ Cubs || 2–3 || Foster || Glavine (13–8) || Patterson || — || 83–50
|- bgcolor="ccffcc"
| 134 || August 30 || @ Cubs || 6–5 || Borowski (2–1) || Bottenfield || Wohlers (34) || 31,548 || 84–50
|- bgcolor="ffbbbb"
| 135 || August 31 || @ Cubs || 0–12 || Castillo || Neagle (0–1) || Adams || 38,691 || 84–51
|-

|- bgcolor="ffbbbb"
| 136 || September 1 || @ Cubs || 1–2 (12) || Campbell || Borowski (2–2) || — || 40,192 || 84–52
|- bgcolor="ffbbbb"
| 137 || September 2 || @ Reds || 6–7 || Shaw || McMichael (5–3) || Brantley || 20,879 || 84–53
|- bgcolor="ffbbbb"
| 138 || September 3 || @ Reds || 1–5 || Burba || Bielecki (4–3) || Shaw || 18,844 || 84–54
|- bgcolor="ffbbbb"
| 139 || September 4 || @ Reds || 6–12 || Salkeld || Glavine (13–9) || — || 19,532 || 84–55
|- bgcolor="ccffcc"
| 140 || September 6 || Mets || 8–7 || Wohlers (2–3) || Henry || — || 37,660 || 85–55
|- bgcolor="ccffcc"
| 141 || September 7 || Mets || 6–1 || Smoltz (21–7) || Jones || — || 47,130 || 86–55
|- bgcolor="ffbbbb"
| 142 || September 8 || Mets || 2–6 || Clark || Maddux (13–11) || — || 39,045 || 86–56
|- bgcolor="ffbbbb"
| 143 || September 10 || @ Rockies || 8–9 || Holmes || Clontz (6–3) || Ruffin || 48,051 || 86–57
|- bgcolor="ffbbbb"
| 144 || September 11 || @ Rockies || 5–6 || Wright || Neagle (0–2) || Swift || 48,091 || 86–58
|- bgcolor="ffbbbb"
| 145 || September 12 || @ Rockies || 8–16 || Burke || Smoltz (21–8) || — || 48,052 || 86–59
|- bgcolor="ffbbbb"
| 146 || September 13 || @ Mets || 4–6 || Dipoto || Borowski (2–3) || Wallace || 17,331 || 86–60
|- bgcolor="ffbbbb"
| 147 || September 14 || @ Mets || 5–6 (12) || Wallace || Borowski (2–4) || — || 22,857 || 86–61
|- bgcolor="ccffcc"
| 148 || September 15 || @ Mets || 3–2 || Glavine (14–9) || Wilson || Wohlers (35) || 23,718 || 87–61
|- bgcolor="ccffcc"
| 149 || September 16 || @ Mets || 5–2 || Neagle (1–2) || Harnisch || — || 14,980 || 88–61
|- bgcolor="ccffcc"
| 150 || September 17 || Astros || 5–4 || Smoltz (22–8) || Kile || Wohlers (36) || 32,109 || 89–61
|- bgcolor="ccffcc"
| 151 || September 18 || Astros || 6–2 || Maddux (14–11) || Hampton || — || 29,885 || 90–61
|- bgcolor="ffbbbb"
| 152 || September 19 || Expos || 1–5 || Urbina || Wohlers (2–4) || — || 37,193 || 90–62
|- bgcolor="ccffcc"
| 153 || September 20 || Expos || 3–2 || Glavine (15–9) || Leiper || Wohlers (37) || 46,260 || 91–62
|- bgcolor="ccffcc"
| 154 || September 21 || Expos || 5–4 || Neagle (2–2) || Daal || Wohlers (38) || 49,285 || 92–62
|- bgcolor="ccffcc"
| 155 || September 22 || Expos || 8–2 || Smoltz (23–8) || Fassero || — || 49,238 || 93–62
|- bgcolor="ccffcc"
| 156 || September 23 || Expos || 3–1 || Maddux (15–11) || Leiter || Bielecki (2) || 49,083 || 94–62
|- bgcolor="ffbbbb"
| 157 || September 24 || @ Marlins || 1–12 || Rapp || Avery (7–9) || — || 18,245 || 94–63
|- bgcolor="ffbbbb"
| 158 || September 25 || @ Marlins || 0–3 || Brown || Glavine (15–10) || Nen || 29,178 || 94–64
|- bgcolor="ffbbbb"
| 159 || September 26 || @ Marlins || 1–7 || Leiter || Neagle (2–3) || — || 25,553 || 94–65
|- bgcolor="ccffcc"
| 160 || September 27 || @ Expos || 6–4 || Smoltz (24–8) || Fassero || Wohlers (39) || 33,133 || 95–65
|- bgcolor="ccffcc"
| 161 || September 28 || @ Expos || 4–0 || Woodall (2–2) || Leiter || — || 34,125 || 96–65
|- bgcolor="ffbbbb"
| 162 || September 29 || @ Expos || 3–6 || Alvarez || Avery (7–10) || Rojas || 30,646 || 96–66
|-

|-
| Legend:       = Win       = LossBold = Braves team member

Postseason Game log

|- bgcolor="ccffcc"
| 1 || October 2 || @ Dodgers || 2–1 (10) || Smoltz (1–0) || Osuna (0–1) || Wohlers (1) || 47,428 || 1–0 
|- bgcolor="ccffcc"
| 2 || October 3 || @ Dodgers || 3–2 || Maddux (1–0) || Valdez (0–1) || Wohlers (2) || 51,916 || 2–0
|- bgcolor="ccffcc"
| 3 || October 5 || Dodgers || 5–2 || Glavine (1–0) || Nomo (0–1) || Wohlers (3) || 52,529 || 3–0
|-

|- bgcolor="ccffcc"
| 1 || October 9 || Cardinals || 4–2 || Smoltz (1–0) || Petkovsek (0–1) || Wohlers (1) || 48,686 || 1–0
|- bgcolor="ffbbbb"
| 2 || October 10 || Cardinals || 3–8 || Stottlemyre (1–0) || Maddux (0–1) || — || 52,067 || 1–1
|- bgcolor="ffbbbb"
| 3 || October 12 || @ Cardinals || 2–3 || Osborne (1–0) || Glavine (0–1) || Eckersley (1) || 56,769 || 1–2
|- bgcolor="ffbbbb"
| 4 || October 13 || @ Cardinals || 3–4 || Eckersley (1–0) || McMichael (0–1) || — || 56,764 || 1–3
|- bgcolor="ccffcc"
| 5 || October 14 || @ Cardinals || 14–0 || Smoltz (2–0) || Stottlemyre (1–1) || — || 56,782 || 2–3
|- bgcolor="ccffcc"
| 6 || October 16 || Cardinals || 3–1 || Maddux (1–1) || Benes (0–1) || Wohlers (2) || 52,067 || 3–3
|- bgcolor="ccffcc"
| 7 || October 17 || Cardinals || 15–0 || Glavine (1–1) || Osborne (1–1) || — || 52,067 || 4–3
|-

|- bgcolor="ccffcc"
| 1 || October 20 || @ Yankees || 12–1 || Smoltz (1–0) || Pettitte (0–1) || — || 56,365 || 1–0
|- bgcolor="ccffcc"
| 2 || October 21 || @ Yankees || 4–0 || Maddux (1–0) || Key (0–1) || — || 56,340 || 2–0
|- bgcolor="ffbbbb"
| 3 || October 22 || Yankees || 2–5 || Cone (1–0) || Glavine (0–1) || Wetteland (1) || 51,843 || 2–1
|- bgcolor="ffbbbb"
| 4 || October 23 || Yankees || 6–8 (10) || Lloyd (1–0) || Avery (0–1) || Wetteland (2) || 51,881 || 2–2
|- bgcolor="ffbbbb"
| 5 || October 24 || Yankees || 0–1 || Pettitte (1–1) || Smoltz (1–1) || Wetteland (3) || 51,881 || 2–3
|- bgcolor="ffbbbb"
| 6 || October 26 || @ Yankees || 2–3 || Key (1–1) || Maddux (1–1) || Wetteland (4) || 56,375 || 2–4
|-

Detailed records

Opening Day starters
Jeff Blauser
Marquis Grissom
David Justice
Ryan Klesko
Mark Lemke
Javy Lopez
Greg Maddux
Fred McGriff
Mike Mordecai

Notable transactions
 June 4, 1996: Marcus Giles was drafted by the Braves in the 53rd round of the 1996 amateur draft. Player signed May 26, 1997.
 June 24, 1996: Mark Whiten signed as a free agent with the Braves.
 August 13, 1996: Terry Pendleton was traded by the Florida Marlins to the Braves for Roosevelt Brown.
 August 14, 1996: Mark Whiten was traded by the Braves to the Seattle Mariners for Roger Blanco (minors).
 August 17, 1996: Luis Polonia was signed as a free agent with the Braves.
 August 30, 1996: Jason Schmidt was sent by the Braves to the Pittsburgh Pirates to complete an earlier deal made on August 28, 1996. The Braves sent a player to be named later, Ron Wright, and Corey Pointer (minors) to the Pirates for Denny Neagle. The Braves sent Jason Schmidt (August 30, 1996) to the Pirates to complete the trade.

Roster

Player stats

Batting

Starters by position 
Note: Pos = Position; G = Games played; AB = At bats; H = Hits; Avg. = Batting average; HR = Home runs; RBI = Runs batted in

Other batters 
Note: G = Games played; AB = At bats; H = Hits; Avg. = Batting average; HR = Home runs; RBI = Runs batted in

Pitching

Starting pitchers 
Note: G = Games pitched; IP = Innings pitched; W = Wins; L = Losses; ERA = Earned run average; SO = Strikeouts

Other pitchers 
Note: G = Games pitched; IP = Innings pitched; W = Wins; L = Losses; ERA = Earned run average; SO = Strikeouts

Relief pitchers 
Note: G = Games pitched; W = Wins; L = Losses; SV = Saves; ERA = Earned run average; SO = Strikeouts

National League Divisional Playoffs

Atlanta Braves vs. Los Angeles Dodgers
Atlanta wins the series, 3-0

National League Championship Series

Game 1
October 9: Atlanta–Fulton County Stadium in Atlanta

Game 2
October 10: Atlanta–Fulton County Stadium in Atlanta

Game 3
October 12: Busch Stadium in St. Louis, Missouri

Game 4
October 13: Busch Stadium in St. Louis, Missouri

Game 5
October 14: Busch Stadium in St. Louis, Missouri

Game 6
October 16: Atlanta–Fulton County Stadium in Atlanta

Game 7
October 17: Atlanta–Fulton County Stadium in Atlanta

World Series

Game 1
October 20, 1996, at Yankee Stadium in New York City

Game 2
October 21, 1996, at Yankee Stadium in New York City

Game 3
October 22, 1996, at Atlanta–Fulton County Stadium in Atlanta

Game 4
October 23, 1996, at Atlanta–Fulton County Stadium in Atlanta

Game 5
October 24, 1996, at Atlanta–Fulton County Stadium in Atlanta

Game 6
October 26, 1996, at Yankee Stadium in New York City

Award winners
 Tom Glavine, P, Silver Slugger Award
 Marquis Grissom, OF, Gold Glove Award
 Javy López, C, NLCS MVP
 Greg Maddux, P, Gold Glove Award
 John Smoltz, P, Pitcher of the Month Award, April
 John Smoltz, P, Pitcher of the Month Award, May
 John Smoltz, P, National League Cy Young Award
 John Smoltz, Sporting News Pitcher of the Year Award

1996 Major League Baseball All-Star Game
 Fred McGriff, 1B, starter
 Chipper Jones, 3B, starter
 John Smoltz, P, starter
 Tom Glavine, P, reserve
 Greg Maddux, P, reserve
 Mark Wohlers, P, reserve

Farm system

Notes

References 
 1996 Atlanta Braves at Baseball Reference

Atlanta Braves seasons
Atlanta Braves season
National League East champion seasons
National League champion seasons
Atlanta